DZRC (873 AM) Radyo Champion was a radio station owned and operated by Filipinas Broadcasting Network. The station's studio and transmitter were located along Capt. F. Aquende Dr., Legazpi, Albay. It went off the air in 2017.

References

Radio stations established in 1960
Radio stations disestablished in 2017
Radio stations in Legazpi, Albay
News and talk radio stations in the Philippines
Defunct radio stations in the Philippines